Fábio Ruben Moreira Tavares (born 26 March 1988 in Almada, Setúbal District) is a Portuguese professional footballer who plays as a forward for ME Asteras.

References

External links

1988 births
Living people
Sportspeople from Almada
Portuguese people of Cape Verdean descent
Portuguese footballers
Association football forwards
Odivelas F.C. players
GS Loures players
Super League Greece players
Football League (Greece) players
Atromitos F.C. players
Anagennisi Giannitsa F.C. players
PAE Kerkyra players
Apollon Pontou FC players
Ilioupoli F.C. players
Portuguese expatriate footballers
Expatriate footballers in Greece
Portuguese expatriate sportspeople in Greece